Dinalupihan, officially the Municipality of Dinalupihan,  is a 1st class municipality in the province of Bataan, Philippines. According to the 2020 census, it has a population of 118,209 people.

Dinalupihan, the only landlocked town in the province, is accessible via SCTEX (Subic–Clark–Tarlac Expressway) and the Bataan Provincial Expressway, off Exit 5.

Etymology
"Dinalupijan" came from the festival rites of the Aetas commemorating the deity "Indianalo", the goddess of hunting and bountiful harvest. "Indianalo" was paired with the Sanskrit word "jann", meaning paradise. "Indianalopijann" was the name given to the land that the Aetas received from their goddess which translates to Indianalo's paradise. As time passed, the name "Indianalopijann" turned into "Dinalupihan".

The name "Dinalupihan" also means "empty lands", coming from the Spanish terms din, a, and lupia. It referred to the fact that it failed to produce little revenue while it was an estate of the Archdiocese of Manila during the second half of the 18th century.

Geography
Dinalupihan borders Hermosa to the south and southeast, the province of Zambales to the northwest and the province of Pampanga to the north and northeast. Floridablanca, Pampanga, is located directly to the north, and San Fernando, Pampanga, its regional center is located to the north-northeast.

According to the Philippine Statistics Authority, the municipality has a land area of  constituting  of the  total area of Bataan.

Climate

Barangays
Dinalupihan is politically subdivided into 46 barangays.

Demographics

In the 2020 census, Dinalupihan had a population of 118,209.

Economy

Government
Pursuant to the Local government in the Philippines", the political seat of the municipal government is located at the Municipal Town Hall. In the History of the Philippines (1521–1898), the Gobernadorcillo was the Chief Executive who held office in the Presidencia. During the American rule (1898–1946), the elected Mayor and local officials, including the appointed ones hold office at the Municipal Town Hall. The legislative and executive departments perform their functions in the Sangguniang Bayan (Session Hall) and Municipal Trial Court, respectively, and are located in the Town Hall.

Elected officials
Dinalupihan, Bataan's incumbent mayor is Gila Garcia (NUP) and the vice mayor is Renato Matawaran (Aksyon).

Sangguniang Bayan Members are: Ricardo De Ausen, Martin Tongol Jr., Danny Dela Cruz, Rolly Buniag, Amy Sandoval, Zaldy Torno, Maning Inza Cruz, Arnold Soriano, ABC Armando Buniag and SK Ernest Estanislao.

Tourism
Dinalupihan's interesting points, landmarks and festivals, are:

 Battle of Bataan, Layac Junction marker
 World War II First Line of Defense Memorial (Battle of Bataan - Battle of Layac Junction, January 6, 1942)
 38th Infantry Division (United States) marker, Layac Junction
 Roosevelt Protected Landscape, also known as Roosevelt Park, is the location shooting of Enchanted Garden
 Town Hall
 Bataan Peninsula State University, Dinalupihan campus
 Bataan Peninsula Medical Center
 1960 Saint John Academy
 Glorrieta, open auditorium, grandstand, park and plaza
 Dinalupihan Civic Center
 Heaven's Garden Memorial Park
 Dinalupihan Memorial Park
 Mount Malasimbo
 Tubig Festival (June 24)

Saint John the Baptist Parish Church

Saint John the Baptist Parish Church (in Poblacion) belongs to the Roman Catholic Diocese of Balanga (Dioecesis Balangensis) Part of the Ecclesiastical Province of San Fernando, Pampanga Created: March 17, 1975. Canonically Erected: November 7, 1975. Comprises the whole civil province of Bataan. Titular: St. Joseph, Husband of Mary, April 28. Bishop Most Reverend Ruperto Cruz Santos, DD).

Its Feast day is June 24. It is under the Vicariate of Saint Peter of Verona I - Vicariate of Our Lady, Mirror of Justice. The Catholic population is about 25,438.

Notable personalities
 Gary David — PBA multi-awarded player
 Chito Jaime — PBA player
 Jackie Rice — Filipina actress who won the title of Ultimate Female Survivor on the third season of Startstruck.
 Felicito Payumo — Chairman of the Subic Bay Metropolitan Authority from 1998 to 2004.
 Anthony Morales — Executive Assistant of the Subic Bay Metropolitan Authority from 2015–Present.
 Tommy Peñaflor — Actor, Model, Dancer finalist of Eat Bulaga's That's My Bae.

Gallery

References

External links

[ Philippine Standard Geographic Code]

Municipalities of Bataan